The Joan C. Edwards Charitable Foundation was created in 2006 upon the death of Joan C. Edwards, a well-known West Virginia-based philanthropist.

History 

The Joan C. Edwards Charitable Foundation was created by a bequest from the Joan C. Edwards Trust in 2006 at the time of Mrs. Edwards' death. Mrs. Edwards was a philanthropist and former jazz singer. Her husband, James, who died in 1991, was owner and CEO of National Mattress Company in Huntington, W.Va., where the couple lived most of their lives.

Edwards Scholarship 
The Joan C. Edwards Charitable Foundation has created the Edwards Scholarship.  This 8-year full-ride scholarship will be given to one student from CSSM to attend CWRU and CWRU School of Medicine.

The foundation has committed to an initial investment of $10 million to $12 million for an endowment that will fund at least one of the mega-scholarships every year, beginning in 2011. CWRU will provide free room and board. Eventually, the endowment could grow to support more than one annual award.

Notes and references

External links 

H3P League of Scholars Official Website

Companies based in Cleveland
Organizations established in 2006
Medical and health foundations in the United States
Medical and health organizations based in Ohio